Antônio Olinto Marques da Rocha (Ubá, MG - May 10, 1919 – Rio de Janeiro, RJ - September 12, 2009) was a Brazilian writer, essayist and translator.

Among his work are included poetry, novels, literary criticism, political analysis, children's literature and dictionaries.

He occupied the 8th chair of the Brazilian Academy of Letters from 1997 until his death in 2009.

References

1919 births
2009 deaths
Members of the Brazilian Academy of Letters
Brazilian male poets
Brazilian translators
Brazilian literary critics
People from Ubá
Brazilian essayists
Translators to Portuguese
20th-century Brazilian poets
20th-century translators
20th-century essayists
20th-century Brazilian male writers